Brandon Charles Boyd (born February 15, 1976) is an American singer, songwriter, musician, author and visual artist. He is best known as the lead vocalist of the American rock band Incubus, with whom he has recorded eight studio albums.

In addition to his work with Incubus, Boyd has released two solo albums - The Wild Trapeze (2010) and Echoes & Cocoons (2022) - and has collaborated with producer Brenden O'Brien under the name Sons of the Sea.

Early life
Boyd graduated from Calabasas High School  in 1994 and attended Moorpark College for two years before committing to Incubus. Brandon grew up in Calabasas, California with Ricky Taylor who inspired him to write music. His parents, Priscilla "Dolly" Wiseman and Charles Boyd, both of whom had experience in entertainment, with his father being a former Marlboro Man, had nurtured his artistic side since he was a child. Other notable family members include his younger brother, Jason Boyd, the former lead singer of the band Audiovent, his cousin Berto Boyd, an accomplished Flamenco guitarist and composer, as well as cousin Sam Boyd, a professional motocross rider. In an interview, Brandon explained that he had "yet to stumble across his best work" because he lacked the ability to read music.

Incubus
Boyd designed concert fliers that advertised Incubus' early performances. He occasionally plays guitar during live performances and is known for bringing unusual instruments into his songs, such as the didgeridoo and djembe.

Boyd's voice was part of what enticed Sony's Epic/Immortal Records, along with the self-released album Fungus Amongus. The band was signed in 1996. Boyd's singing style in Incubus has often been compared to Mike Patton, vocalist of Faith No More and several other projects. Boyd has mentioned Patton as being an influence since he was an early teenager. Incubus' first two releases on the label, Enjoy Incubus and S.C.I.E.N.C.E. went largely unnoticed in the mainstream but subsequent releases Make Yourself and Morning View were commercial successes. Boyd attracted a large number of female fans. In a 2001 interview, Spin wrote "Considering his androgynous beauty and sweet demeanor, plus Incubus' kid-tested/mother-approved guitar rock, it's no surprise he's MTV's newest weapon of mass heartbreak. Girls scream for him to take his shirt off at Incubus shows (he usually obliges) and Teen People recently voted him one of 'The Hottest Guys in Music.' His sensitive-guy appeal sets him apart from today's testosterone-drunk rock". The band's 2004 release A Crow Left of the Murder... has continued their success, nominating the band for Best Hard Rock Performance in the 2005 Grammy Awards. On November 28, 2006, the band released Light Grenades. On June 16, 2009, Incubus released a greatest hits album titled Monuments and Melodies.

In 2011 Incubus finished their seventh studio album If Not Now, When?, released on July 12, 2011, followed by a tour. It was their final release under Sony.

On December 13, 2014, they performed their upcoming single entitled "Trust Fall" at KROQ. They announced the release of two EP's in 2015 with the first, Trust Fall, released on March 24, 2015, through Island Records. On February 5, 2015, the single "Absolution Calling" was released. Two years later, in February 2017, Boyd and Incubus teamed with Skrillex on a collaboration that was released under the title "8" in April 2017.

Literature and fine art
Although Boyd had been drawing his entire life, between 2003 and 2008 he focused more seriously on creating fine art, specifically painting. During this time he participated in many different group and solo art shows, using his artwork as a means for environmental activism. September 8, 2008, marked the opening of his first solo show, "Ectoplasm," at Mr. Musichead Gallery in Los Angeles, California.

In March 2020, Boyd had planned to debut a new large-scale solo exhibit, "Impossible Knots," at the Samuel Lynne Galleries in Dallas, Texas. However, due to the COVID-19 pandemic, the in-person exhibit had to be postponed. On April 18, 2020, his work debuted online via a virtual exhibition preview on Instagram LIVE. This online debut will be followed by the in-person exhibition in Fall 2020 or Spring 2021.

Boyd released a card-matching game called "Two Doors/Deux Portes," based on a series of his watercolor paintings.

Boyd has written and curated three books, each of which comprise his personal illustrations, photography, song lyrics, and additional thoughts and writings. His books are White Fluffy Clouds (2003), From the Murks of the Sultry Abyss (2007), and So the Echo (2013), all published under his book imprint, Endophasia Publications. So the Echo "visually weaves" the years that Boyd spent honing his craft and his talents, both in music and art.

Charity and activism 
In the spring of 2011, Boyd made a large mural at the Hurley Space Gallery in order to raise awareness about single use plastics and their harmful effects on the world's oceans.

Boyd is involved with many organizations and charitable causes and in 2003, along with his Incubus bandmates, he founded the 501(c)(3) non-profit The Make Yourself Foundation, which has raised over $1.4 million for various philanthropic causes locally and globally. The organization has awarded grant funding to over 60 nonprofit organizations.

Jesus Christ Superstar Arena Spectacular 2014
Boyd was selected to play the role of Judas Iscariot for the North American arena tour of Andrew Lloyd Webber's rock opera Jesus Christ Superstar. He was to play the role starting June 9 through August 17.  On May 31, the tour was canceled.

Solo career
On July 6, 2010, Boyd announced that his debut solo album, The Wild Trapeze was released. On June 21, 2010, a music video for Boyd's first single from The Wild Trapeze, entitled "Runaway Train," was released online. A second music video was released for the album, for the song "Last Night a Passenger" in October 2010.

On January 18, 2013, Brandon announced his band, Sons of the Sea. With Incubus on hiatus, Sons of the Sea toured in 2013 and 2014. On May 29, 2013, Brandon released a teaser video announcing the name of the album, Sons of the Sea. That same year, he embarked on a book-signing tour of the Northeast to coincide with his latest publication "So The Echo," as well as the release of "Sons of the Sea"'s eponymous record.

On March 11, 2022, Brandon released his first solo album in 12 years, Echoes & Cocoons, produced by John Congleton.

Tattoos
Boyd is known for his wide variety of tattoos. On his forearms he carries the widely known mantra Om Mani Padme Hum, referring to the qualities of generosity, ethics, patience, diligence, renunciation and wisdom. Underneath that is a koi fish in red ink by Lars Johansson. On the inside of his right arm he has several tattoos, one once again incorporating the Tibetan mantra. Following the release of their album "A Crow Left of the Murder," he got an elaborate back tattoo featuring the common image of the All Seeing-Eye embedded in a pyramid. He also has a tattoo of the Eye of Horus on his right ankle. Other tattoos include his parents' names (Priscilla and Charles) on his forearms, an owl on his back, one teardrop on his index finger on both hands, and a picture inspired by Aubrey Beardsley's famous piece, The Peacock Skirt, on his left arm.

Discography

With Incubus
Fungus Amongus (1995)
Enjoy Incubus (EP) (1997)
S.C.I.E.N.C.E. (1997)
Make Yourself (1999)
Morning View (2001)
A Crow Left of the Murder... (2004)
Light Grenades (2006)
Monuments and Melodies (2009)
If Not Now, When? (2011)
Trust Fall (Side A) (EP) (2015)
8 (2017)
Trust Fall (Side B) (EP) (2020)

Solo
The Wild Trapeze (2010)
Echoes & Cocoons (2022)

With Sons of the Sea
Compass (EP) (2013)
Sons of the Sea (2013)

 Guest Appearances
Strait Up - Snot (2000)
Leave on Your Makeup - Ben Kenney (2013)

References

External links

1976 births
Living people
21st-century American writers
21st-century American painters
Alternative metal musicians
American male singers
American rock singers
American tenors
Incubus (band) members
Moorpark College alumni
Singers from California
People from Van Nuys, Los Angeles
People from Calabasas, California
American male painters
Nu metal singers
21st-century American singers
Didgeridoo players